Tubada was an outer garment for men in India. It was a coat, part of a Hindu's costume in the early 19th century. John Forbes Watson mentions it as a ''wide great coat'' in his book The Textile Manufactures and the Costumes of the People of India, London, 1866.

See also 

 Achkan
 Jama (coat)
 Mujib coat
 Nehru jacket

References 

 
History of clothing
Indian clothing